Kolomenskoye is a former royal estate situated several kilometers to the southeast of the city center of Moscow, Russia, on the ancient road leading to the town of Kolomna (hence the name). The 390 hectare scenic area overlooks the steep banks of the Moskva River. It became a part of Moscow in the 1960s.

The White Column of Kolomenskoye
Kolomenskoye village was first mentioned in the testament of Ivan Kalita (1339). As time went by, the village was developed as a favourite country estate of grand princes of Muscovy. The earliest existing structure is the exceptional Ascension church (1532), built in white stone to commemorate the long-awaited birth of an heir to the throne, the future Ivan the Terrible. Being the first stone church of tent-like variety, the uncanonical "White Column" (as it is sometimes referred to) marked a stunning break from the Byzantine tradition.

The church reaches toward the sky from a low cross-shaped podklet (ground floor), followed by a prolonged chetverik (octagonal body, and then an octagonal tent, crowned by a tiny dome. The narrow pilasters on the sides of the chetverik, the arrow-shaped window frames, the three tiers of the kokoshniks and the quiet rhythm of stair arcades and open galleries underline the dynamic tendency of this masterpiece of the Russian architecture. The whole vertical composition is believed to have been borrowed from hipped roof-style wooden churches of the Russian North. Recognizing its outstanding value for humanity, UNESCO decided to inscribe the church on the World Heritage List in 1994.

The great palace and other structures
Tsar Alexis I had all the previous wooden structures in Kolomenskoye demolished and replaced them with a new great wooden palace, famed for its fanciful, fairytale roofs. Foreigners referred to this huge maze of intricate corridors and 250 rooms, as 'an Eighth Wonder of the World'. Although basically only a summer palace, it was the favorite residence of Tsar Alexis I. The future Empress Elizabeth Petrovna was born in the palace in 1709, and Tsar Peter the Great spent part of his youth here. Upon the departure of the court for St. Petersburg, the palace fell into disrepair, so that Catherine II refused to make it her Moscow residence. On her orders the wooden palace was demolished in 1768, and replaced with a much more modest stone-and-brick structure. 

Detailed plans of the Alexis I palace survived. The Moscow Government completed a full-scale reconstruction in 2010. The palace erected by Catherine the Great in 1768 was demolished in 1872, and only a few gates and outside buildings remain.

During the early Soviet period, under the initiative of architect and restorer Pyotr Baranovsky, old wooden buildings and various artifacts were transported to Kolomenskoye from different parts of the USSR for preservation, so currently Kolomenskoye Park hosts an impressive set of different constructions and historical objects.

Local buildings
Church of John the Baptist in Dyakovo, 16th century. The church stands on the Dyakovo hill, located southwest from the Kolomenskoye hill. The church has five tent-like structures, and was probably constructed around 1547, reputedly by architect Postnik Yakovlev, the author of Saint Basil's Cathedral on the Red Square.
Church of St. George, 16th century
Standalone belltower for the church of St. George, 16th century
Standalone refectory for the church of St. George, 16th century
Church of Our Lady of Kazan, 17th century
Watertower, 17th century
Front gates, 1671–73
Polkovhichyi chambers, 17th century
Prikaznye chambers, 17th century
Sytny yard, 17th century
Back gates, 17th century
Park pavilion, 1825
Park gates, 19th century

Constructions and artifacts brought from elsewhere
Barbican church of the Nikolo-Korelsky Monastery
Bratsk Stockade Tower
Boris stone from Belarus
Kurgan stele, from a Polovtsian burial mound
Chasovoy pole, 17th century
Tower from the Sumskoy Ostrog fortress, 17th century
Memorial pole from Shaydorovo village, 19th century
Mead making facility, 18th century
Peter the Great house (18th century) from the Northern Dvina
Lion's Gates from the Moscow Kremlin (surviving fragments)

Reconstructions
Water mill on the Zhuzha River

Natural features
Oak-trees grove (one of the oldest oaks in Moscow)
Golosov Ravine with sacred stones and springs in it
Streams:
Zhuzha River, emerging from underground
Kolomenskoye Stream, in Golosov Ravine
Kolutushkin Stream, in the ravine of that name
Dyakovskaya Stream, in the ravine of that name, into which several other ravines empty (all on the left: Vospenkov, Lekseev, Bazarihin, Radyushin)

Archeological sites
Dyakovo settlement

See also
Tsaritsyno Park
Kuskovo
Arkhangelskoye Estate
Open-air museum

References
Dixon, Simon. Catherine the Great (Profiles in Power). Harlow, UK: Longman, 2001 (paperback).

External links

Photo (1024x768)
German page on Kolomenskoye
Kolomenskoye Museum Reserve (Moscow)
Many rare photos

Churches in Moscow
Palaces in Moscow
Royal residences in Russia
World Heritage Sites in Russia
Rural history museums in Russia
Architecture museums
Open-air museums in Russia
Museums in Moscow
Parks and gardens in Moscow
Cultural heritage monuments of federal significance in Moscow